This is a partial list of topics related to Mauritius.

Geography 

 Le Morne Brabant
 Trou aux Cerfs

Landforms

Banks 
 Hawkins Bank
 Nazareth Bank
 Saya de Malha Bank
 Soudan Banks

Bays 
 Baie du Tombeau
 Blue bay

Islands 
 Mauritius Island
 Islets of Mauritius
 Agalega Islands
 Cargados Carajos
 Île Plate
 Île aux Cerfs
 Île de la Passe
 Rodrigues
 Round Island
 Tromelin Island

Lakes 
 Ganga Talao
 Mare aux Vacoas

Mountains 
 Corps de Garde
 Mont Malartic
 Montagne Cocotte
 Pieter Both (mountain)
 Piton de la Petite Rivière Noire

Rivers 

 Rivière des Créoles
 Rivière du Rempart (river)
 Rivière Tamarin
 Tamarind Falls
 Rivière du Tombeau

Settlements 

 Port Louis (capital city)
 Anse aux Anglais
 Baie du Tombeau
 Bambous
 Bel Ombre
 Bénarès
 Cape Malheureux
 Centre de Flacq
 Chamarel 
 Curepipe
 Flic en Flac
 Fond du Sac
 Grand Baie 
 Grand Gaube
 Grande Rivière Sud Est
 Grande Rivière Noire
 Le Morne
 Mahébourg
 Mapou
 Midlands
 Moka
 Baie aux Huîtres
 Petit Bel Air
 Port Louis
 Port Mathurin
 Providence
 Quartier Militaire
 Quatre Bornes
 Rivière des Créoles
 Rose-Hill 
 Rose-Belle
 St. Pierre
 Souillac
 Tamarin
 Triolet
 Trou aux Biches
 Vacoas-Phoenix
 Vingt-Cinq

History 

 Aapravasi Ghat
 Elections in Mauritius
 Mauritian general election, 2000
 Mauritian general election, 2005
 Mauritian presidential election, 2008
 Josias Rowley
 South African Airways Flight 295
 United Nations Security Council Resolution 249

British Governors 
 Charles Cavendish Boyle
 John Chancellor (British administrator)
 James Harford

Dutch Governors 
 Roelof Deodati
 Hubert Hugo
 Cornelius Gooyer
 Isaac Johannes Lamotius
 Jacob van der Meersch
 Reinier Por
 Dirk Jansz Smient
 Adriaan van der Stel
 Abraham Momber van de Velde
 George Frederik Wreeden

French Governors 
 Camille Charles Leclerc, Chevalier de Fresne
 Guillaume Dufresne d' Arsel
 Pierre Benoît Dumas
 Bertrand-François Mahé de La Bourdonnais

Government and politics 

 Chief Executive of Rodrigues
 Elections in Mauritius
 Law enforcement in Mauritius
 Mauritian passport
 Military of Mauritius
 National Assembly of Mauritius
 Special Mobile Force

Administrative divisions

Districts 
 Flacq
 Grand Port
 Moka
 Pamplemousses
 Plaines Wilhems
 Port Louis
 Rivière du Rempart
 Rivière Noire
 Savanne

Dependencies 

 Agalega Islands (Vingt-Cinq)
 Cargados Carajos Shoals (Raphael)
 Rodrigues (Port Mathurin)

Foreign relations 

 Diplomatic missions of Mauritius
 List of diplomatic missions in Mauritius
 Mauritius–United States relations

Political parties 

 Alliance Sociale
 Hizbullah (Mauritius)
 Lalit
 Mauritian Labour Party
 Mauritian Militant Movement
 Mauritian Militant Socialist Movement
 Mauritian Party of Xavier-Luc Duval
 Mauritian Social Democrat Party
 Militant Socialist Movement
 Republican Movement (Mauritius)
 Rodrigues Movement
 Rodrigues People's Organisation
 The Greens (Mauritius)

Politicians 
 List of governors-general of Mauritius
 John Shaw Rennie
 Leonard Williams (politician)
 Raman Osman
 Henry Garrioch
 Dayendranath Burrenchobay
 Seewoosagur Ramgoolam
 Veerasamy Ringadoo
 List of presidents of Mauritius
 Veerasamy Ringadoo
 Cassam Uteem
 Angidi Chettiar (acting)
 Ariranga Pillay (acting)
 Karl Offmann
 Anerood Jugnauth
 List of prime ministers of Mauritius
 Seewoosagur Ramgoolam
 Anerood Jugnauth
 Paul Bérenger
 Navin Ramgoolam
 Vice President of Mauritius

Economy 

 Bank of Mauritius
 Mauritian dollar
 Mineral industry of Mauritius
 Mauritian rupee
 Stock Exchange of Mauritius

Companies 

 Air Mauritius
 Emtel
 Harel Mallac Group
 L'Express (Mauritius)
 Le Mauricien
 Mauritius Broadcasting Corporation
 Mauritius Telecom
 National Transport Corporation
 Rogers Group

Banks 
 AfrAsia Bank
 Barclays Bank Mauritius
 Mauritius Commercial Bank
 State Bank of Mauritius

Trade unions 
 Federation of Civil Service Unions
 Federation of Progressive Unions
 Mauritius Labour Congress
 Mauritius Trade Union Congress
 National Trade Unions Confederation
 Organization of Artisans' Unity

Communications 

 Emtel
 .mu (Internet country code top-level domain)

Media 

 Mauritius Broadcasting Corporation
 List of newspapers in Mauritius
 L'Express (Mauritius)
 Le Mauricien

Tourism 

 Black River Gorges National Park
 Blue Penny Museum
 Curepipe Botanic Gardens
 Sir Seewoosagur Ramgoolam Botanical Garden

Transport 

 Air Mauritius
 National Transport Corporation
 South African Airways Flight 295

Airports 

 Rodrigues Island Airport
 Sir Seewoosagur Ramgoolam International Airport

Demographics 

 List of Mauritians
 Women in Mauritius

Ethnic groups 
 Franco-Mauritian
 Indo-Mauritian
 Mauritian Creole people
 Sino-Mauritian
 Tamil diaspora

Languages 
 Arabic language
 Bhojpuri
 Cantonese
 English language
 French language
 Gujarati language
 Hakka Chinese
 Hindi language
 Mandarin Chinese
 Marathi
 Mauritian Creole
 Punjabi language
 Rodriguan Creole
 Tamil language
 Telugu language
 Urdu

Religion 

 Hinduism in Mauritius
 Ganga Talao
 Islam in Mauritius
 Jumma Mosque Mauritius
 Roman Catholicism in Mauritius

Culture 

 Clothing in Mauritius
 Kala pani
 List of Mauritian films
 Mauritian literature
 Mohamedally
 National Library of Mauritius
 Women in Mauritius

Education 

 Pre-primary education in Mauritius
 Primary education in Mauritius
 Secondary education in Mauritius
 Tertiary education in Mauritius
 Vocational education in Mauritius
 List of secondary schools in Mauritius
 List of tertiary institutions in Mauritius
 Mauritius Examinations Syndicate
 Certificate of Primary Education
 National Assessment at Form III
 School Certificate (Mauritius)
 Higher School Certificate (Mauritius)

Schools

Secondary schools

 College du Saint-Esprit
 Dr Regis Chaperon State Secondary School
 Dr. Maurice Cure State College
 Eden College
 Le Bocage International School
 New Educational College
 Rabindranath Tagore Secondary School
 Rodrigues College
 Royal College Curepipe
 Royal College Port Louis
 Saint Mary's College
 Sir Abdool Raman Osman State College
 St Andrew's School
 St. Joseph's College
 Queen Elizabeth College, Mauritius

Tertiary institutions
 Sir Seewoosagur Ramgoolam Medical College
 Mauritius Institute of Training and Development
 University of Mauritius
 University of Technology, Mauritius

Music 

 Motherland (anthem)
 Santé engagé
 Sega music

Musicians and musical groups 

 Grup Latanier
 Menwar

National symbols 
 Coat of arms of Mauritius
 Flag of Mauritius
 Motherland (anthem)

Sport 

 1992 African Championships in Athletics
 2006 African Championships in Athletics
 Champ de Mars Racecourse
 Mauritius at the 2006 Commonwealth Games
 Mauritius national rugby union team

Football 

 Mauritius Football Association
 Mauritius national football team
 Mauritian Cup
 Mauritian League

Football clubs 

 Arsenal Wanderers
 AS de Vacoas-Phoenix
 Curepipe Starlight SC
 Faucon Flacq SC
 Pamplemousses SC
 Petite Rivière Noire SC
 AS Port-Louis 2000

Olympics 

 Mauritius at the 1984 Summer Olympics
 Mauritius at the 1988 Summer Olympics
 Mauritius at the 1992 Summer Olympics
 Mauritius at the 1996 Summer Olympics
 Mauritius at the 2000 Summer Olympics
 Mauritius at the 2004 Summer Olympics
 Mauritius at the 2008 Summer Olympics

Olympic medalists 
 Bruno Julie (bronze medalist)

Tennis 
 Mauritius Davis Cup team
 Mauritius Fed Cup team

Venues 
 Champ de Mars Racecourse
 Stade Anjalay
 Stade Auguste Vollaire
 Stade George V
 Stade Germain Comarmond

Environment 
 Black River Gorges National Park
 Gerald Durrell Endemic Wildlife Sanctuary

Wildlife 

 List of birds of Mauritius

See also 
 Lists of country-related topics
 List of lists of African country-related topics by country

Mauritius